Spilonota grandlacia is a species of moth of the family Tortricidae. It is found in New Caledonia in the south-west Pacific Ocean.

The wingspan is about 14 mm. The ground colour of the forewings is greyish white, with a whiter dorsal patch and greyish costal strigulae (fine streaks). The hindwings are greyish cream, tinged with brownish apically.

References

Moths described in 2013
Eucosmini